Dan Basambombo (born May 26, 1997) is a Congolese-born Canadian football linebacker for the Ottawa Redblacks of the Canadian Football League (CFL). He played U Sports football at Laval and was selected by the Redblacks in the second round of the 2020 CFL Draft.

Early life and education
Basambombo was born on May 26, 1997, in Kinshasa, the capital city of the Democratic Republic of the Congo. He grew up playing soccer before moving with his parents to Canada after he turned 9. Afterwards, he began playing badminton and lived in Ottawa, Ontario. He attended Franco Cite High School and was convinced to try out football by his friends after a time there. Basambombo was a member of his first team, the Canterbury Mustangs, starting at the age of 14 in 2011. He played for the Cumberland Panthers of the Ontario Varsity Football League (OVFL) in 2015, averaging five tackles per game.

Basambombo began attending Université Laval in 2016. He was the youngest player on their football team and was designated a "project." After seeing very limited playing time in his first two seasons, Basambombo became the starter at linebacker after an injury to Marc-Antoine Verin early in the 2018 season. In his second collegiate start, he posted 11 tackles and two quarterback sacks. Basambombo helped the team compile an undefeated 12–0 record while playing in eight games, as they won 34–20 in the 54th Vanier Cup. He finished the season with a total of 31.5 tackles and two sacks. In 2019, he sat out due to academic reasons.

Professional career
Basambombo was selected in the second round of the 2020 CFL Draft with the 19th pick by the Ottawa Redblacks, being a territorial selection from the area given to the Redblacks for being a last place team in the prior season. His rookie season was cancelled due to the COVID-19 pandemic. He signed a contract with the team in February 2021. That year, he saw limited action as a special teams player and appeared in five games. Basambombo's role increased in 2022, as he played in all 18 games and posted six tackles.

References

1997 births
Living people
Canadian football linebackers
Laval Rouge et Or football players
Ottawa Redblacks players
Sportspeople from Kinshasa
Democratic Republic of the Congo sportspeople